James Goode (born 5 September 1982) is a Welsh rugby union player. He played for the Cardiff Blues in the Celtic League but left the team at the end of the 2007–08 season. He also played for the Manawatu Turbos in Palmerston North, New Zealand. Goode's position of choice is at lock. He began the 2011–12 season playing for the Ospreys, but has since moved to the Newcastle Falcons on loan.

References

External links
 Ospreysrugby.com

1982 births
Living people
Cardiff Rugby players
Manawatu rugby union players
Newcastle Falcons players
Ospreys (rugby union) players
Rugby union players from Cardiff
Welsh rugby union players
Rugby union locks